Vena is a locality situated in Hultsfred Municipality, Kalmar County, Sweden with 367 inhabitants in 2010.

References 

Populated places in Kalmar County
Populated places in Hultsfred Municipality